Giovanni Battista Leonetti was an Italian engraver. He worked in Rome at the commencement of the 19th century, and died before 1830. He engraved works by Guercino and Francesco Gessi.

References

Italian engravers
19th-century deaths
Year of birth unknown